Maratus vespa is a species of the peacock spider genus, Maratus, characterised by its distinctive courtship display. The male spiders are characterized by a bright abdomen, lateral flaps, and an elongated third pair of legs. When attempting to attract a mate, the male spider will raise its colorful abdomen and elongated third pair of legs and wave them, along with extending its lateral flaps. This complex display of courtship is analogous of that of a peacock, hence the common name of this spider species.

References

Further reading

Maddison, Wayne P. "A phylogenetic classification of jumping spiders (Araneae: Salticidae)." Journal of Arachnology 43.3 (2015): 231-292.
Waldock, Julianne M. "A new species of peacock spider, Maratus proszynskii sp. nov. (Araneae: Salticidae: Euophryini), from Tasmania, with a review of Maratus in Tasmania, Australia." RECORDS OF THE WESTERN AUSTRALIAN MUSEUM 144.150 (2015): 150.

External links
BBC News video
Australian Geographic video

Salticidae
Spiders of Australia
Spiders described in 2016